American singer-songwriter Taylor Swift has released 10 original studio albums, 2 re-recorded studio albums, 26 extended plays, 4 live albums, and 19 other minor works. She has sold an estimated 114 million album units worldwide. As of 2019, her US albums sales stood at 37.3 million and her UK albums sales 3.34 million. According to the Recording Industry Association of America (RIAA), Swift has accumulated 51 million certified album units in the United States. As of December 2022, she is the woman with the most weeks (60) at number one on the US Billboard 200.

Swift signed a record deal with Big Machine Records in 2005 and released her eponymous debut album the following year. With 157 weeks on the Billboard 200 by December 2009, the album was the longest-charting album of the 2000s decade. Swift's second studio album, Fearless (2008), topped the Billboard 200 for 11 weeks and was the only album from the 2000s decade to spend one year in the top 10. The album was certified Diamond by the RIAA. It also topped charts in Australia and Canada, and has sold 12 million copies worldwide. Her third studio album, the self-written Speak Now (2010), spent six weeks atop the Billboard 200 and topped charts in Australia, Canada, and New Zealand.

Her fourth studio album, Red (2012), was her first number-one album in the United Kingdom. It topped charts in Australia, Canada, Ireland, New Zealand, and spent seven weeks at number one on the Billboard 200. Swift scored her fourth US number-one album with 1989 (2014), which topped the Billboard 200 for 11 weeks and was certified 9× Platinum by the RIAA. It topped the charts in other countries including Australia, Canada, and New Zealand. Her sixth studio album, Reputation (2017), made Swift the first music artist to have four consecutive albums each sell over one million copies within its debut week. It spent four weeks atop the Billboard 200.

Exiting Big Machine, Swift signed with Universal Music Group label Republic Records in 2018. Her seventh studio album, Lover (2019), was the year's global best-selling album by a solo artist. Swift released two studio albums in 2020, Folklore and Evermore, which respectively spent eight and four weeks atop the Billboard 200. Swift released two re-recorded albums, Fearless (Taylor's Version) and Red (Taylor's Version), in 2021, after a dispute with Big Machine over the rights to the masters of her first six albums; the former was the first re-recorded album to top the Billboard 200. Swift's tenth original studio album, Midnights (2022), became her fifth to sell over a million US first-week copies; It was also the first album to sell over a million physical sales since 2015. It broke sales and streaming records including the biggest US single-week vinyl sales and the most single-day streams on Spotify. Swift became the first artist to have the best-selling album of a calendar year six times (Fearless in 2009, 1989 in 2014, Reputation in 2017, Lover in 2019, Folklore in 2020, and Midnights in 2022).

Studio albums

Re-recordings

Live albums

Extended plays

Studio extended plays

Live extended plays

Miscellaneous

Streaming-exclusive compilations

Box set

Footnotes

References

External links
 Official website
 Taylor Swift at AllMusic
 

Country music discographies
Discographies of American artists
Pop music discographies
Discography